The Rescue is the first and only studio of Australian band Horsell Common. The album was released on 29 September 2007. The album entered the Australian Independent Records Charts at #6. and the ARIA Charts at number 100.

Track listing
"Good from Afar" - 3:17
"Bruise Easy" - 3:00
"Automation" - 5:22
"Help is on Its Way" - 3:40
"Sing the News" - 3:27
"Annie, If You're Listening" (featuring Lisa Gammaldi of Capeside) - 3:39
"It's OK" - 3:33
"I'm Dead" (featuring Stephen Christian of Anberlin) - 5:02
"The Sound of Breaking Records" - 2:48
"Gone for the Summer" - 3:01
"Surgery" - 5:41

Charts

Personnel
Mark Stewart - vocals, guitar
Luke Cripps - bass guitar
Leigh Pengelly - drums
Stephen Christian - guest vocals on "I’m Dead"
Lisa Gammaldi - guest vocals on "Annie, If You’re Listening"
Stephen Haigler - producer

References

2007 albums
Horsell Common albums